Pattern search may refer to:
 Pattern search (optimization)
 Pattern recognition (computing)
 Pattern recognition (psychology)
 Pattern mining
 String searching algorithm
 Fuzzy string searching
 Bitap algorithm
 K-optimal pattern discovery
 Nearest neighbor search
 Eyeball search